Robert Pattinson (born 1986) is an English actor.

Robert Pattinson may also refer to:
Robert Pattinson (politician), MP for Grantham
Sir Robert Pattinson Academy, North Hykeham, Lincolnshire, England

See also
Bob Pattinson (1933–1963), Australian rules footballer
Robert E. Pattison (1850–1904), governor of Pennsylvania
Robert Patterson (disambiguation)
Robert Paterson (disambiguation)